Teoman Örge (born March 27, 1990) is a Turkish professional basketball player of Gelişim Koleji.

External links
Profile at tblstat.net
Profile at tbl.org.tr

1990 births
Living people
Alpella basketball players
Galatasaray S.K. (men's basketball) players
Shooting guards
Turkish men's basketball players